In the Battle of Ager Sanguinis, also known as the Battle of the Field of Blood, the Battle of Sarmada, or the Battle of Balat, Roger of Salerno's Crusader army of the Principality of Antioch was annihilated by the army of Ilghazi of Mardin, the Artuqid ruler of Aleppo on 28 June 1119.

Background
Antioch and the other Crusader States were constantly at war with the Muslim states of Northern Syria and the Jazeerah, principally Aleppo and Mosul. When Ridwan of Aleppo died in 1113, there was a period of peace, at least for a few years. However, Roger of Salerno, who was ruling Antioch as regent for Bohemond II, did not take advantage of Ridwan's death; likewise, Baldwin II, count of Edessa, and Pons, count of Tripoli, looked after their own interests and did not ally with Roger against Aleppo. In 1115, Roger defeated a Seljuk Turkish invasion force led by Bursuq ibn Bursuq at the Battle of Sarmin.

In 1117, Aleppo came under the rule of the Artuqid atabeg Ilghazi. In 1118, Roger captured Azaz, which left Aleppo open to attack from the Crusaders; in response, Ilghazi invaded the Principality in 1119. Roger marched out from Artah with Bernard of Valence, the Latin Patriarch of Antioch. Bernard suggested they remain there, as Artah was a well-defended fortress only a short distance away from Antioch, and Ilghazi would not be able to pass if they were stationed there. The Patriarch also advised Roger to call for help from Baldwin, now king of Jerusalem, and Pons, but Roger felt he could not wait for them to arrive.

Roger camped in the pass of Sarmada, while Ilghazi besieged the fort of al-Atharib. A force under Robert of Vieux-Pont set out to break the siege, and Ilghazi feigned a retreat, Robert's men were drawn out from the fort and ambushed.

The battle
Ilghazi was also waiting for reinforcements from Toghtekin, the Burid emir of Damascus, but he too was tired of waiting. Using little-used paths, his army quickly surrounded Roger's camp during the night of 27 June. The prince had recklessly chosen a campsite in a wooded valley with steep sides and few avenues of escape. Roger's army of 700 knights, 500 Armenian cavalry and 3,000 foot soldiers, including turcopoles, hastily formed into five divisions. These drew up in a V-shaped line with the tip farthest from the Muslim battle array. From left to right, the divisions were commanded by Robert of St. Lo, Prince Roger, Guy de Frenelle, Geoffrey the Monk and Peter. Meanwhile, Roger told off a sixth division under Renaud Mansoer to protect the Antiochene rear.

As the Muslim army waited, the qadi Abu al-Fadl ibn al-Khashshab, wearing his lawyer's turban but brandishing a lance, rode out in front of the troopers. At first they were incredulous at being harangued by a scholar but at the end of his passionate evocation of the duties and merits of the jihad warrior, according to Kamal ad-Din, the contemporary historian of Aleppo, these hardened professionals wept with emotion and rode into battle.

That morning, 28 June, the battle was begun by an archery duel between the Antiochene infantry, posted in front of the knights, and the Turkish bowmen. The crusader army was at first successful when the right-hand divisions of Peter and Geoffrey the Monk attacked and defeated the Artuqids opposed to them. Guy de Frenelle's center division had some success also, but the battle was soon decided on the left flank. Robert of St. Lo and the Turcopoles were driven back into Roger's division, disrupting it. A north wind blew dust in the faces of the Antioch knights and footmen, confusing them further. Soon, Artuqid flanking forces enveloped the crusaders.

During the fighting, Roger was killed by a sword in the face at the foot of the great jewelled cross which had served as his standard. The rest of the army was killed or captured; only two knights survived. Renaud Mansoer took refuge in the fort of Sarmada to wait for King Baldwin, but was later taken captive by Ilghazi. Among the other prisoners was likely Walter the Chancellor, who later wrote an account of the battle. The massacre led to the name of the battle, ager sanguinis, Latin for "the field of blood."

Name "ager sanguinis"
The description ager sanguinis is possibly a Biblical reference to the field purchased by Judas with the money he had been given to betray Jesus. The Acts of the Apostles records that Judas killed himself in the field, and it was thus known as acheldemach in Aramaic, and ager sanguinis in the Vulgate.

Casualties
The Turks captured 70 knights and 500 soldiers of inferior rank. The high-ranking prisoners were ransomed and 30 men who could not pay their way out were executed.

Aftermath
Ilghazi soon went on an alcoholic binge and did not advance to Antioch, where Patriarch Bernard was organizing whatever defense he could. Even so, because of the loss of the Antiochene field army, Atharib, Zerdana, Sarmin, Ma'arrat al-Numan and Kafr Tab rapidly fell into Muslim hands.

Ilghazi was defeated by Baldwin II of Jerusalem and Count Pons at the Battle of Hab on 14 August and Baldwin took over the regency of Antioch. Subsequently, Baldwin recovered some of the lost towns. Even so, the defeat at the Field of Blood left Antioch severely weakened, and subject to repeated attacks by the Muslims in the following decade.  Eventually, the Principality came under the influence of a resurgent Byzantine Empire.

The Crusaders regained some of their influence in Syria at the Battle of Azaz six years later in 1125.

Notes

Citations

Bibliography

 Thomas S. Asbridge and Susan B. Edgington, trans. & eds. Walter the Chancellor's The Antiochene Wars: a translation and commentary. Aldershot: Ashgate, 1999.  (Appendices also contain the accounts of Fulcher of Chartres, Albert of Aix, Matthew of Edessa, Orderic Vitalis, and William of Tyre.)
 Geoffrey Hindley, The Crusades: a history of armed pilgrimage and holy war. London: Constable, 2003 

 
 
 

Battles involving the Principality of Antioch
Conflicts in 1119
12th century in the Seljuk Empire
1119 in Asia
1110s in the Crusader states